Pierre Mondy (born Pierre Cuq; 10 February 1925 – 15 September 2012) was a French film and theatre actor and director.

Personal life
He was married four times: to Claude Gensac, Pascale Roberts, Annie Fournier, and Catherine Allary, all actresses. He died on 15 September 2012, aged 87, from lymphoma.

Career
Mondy's first on-screen appearance was in 1949 in Jacques Becker's Rendez-vous de juillet and he appeared in over 140 films over the course of his career. In 1960, he received international recognition for the role of Napoléon Bonaparte in the film Austerlitz directed by Abel Gance. In the 1970s, his most successful film  was the comedy Mais où est donc passée la septième compagnie?. From 1992 until 2005, he appeared in the French television series Les Cordier, juge et flic.

As a voice actor, he voiced Caius Obtus in Asterix et la Surprise de Cesar (Asterix vs. Caesar; 1985) and Cetinlapsus in Asterix Chez Le Bretons (Asterix in Britain; 1986).

Mondy directed four films and thirteen television episodes, and wrote two television screenplay adaptions. He also directed over 60 theatre productions, many of them at the Théâtre du Palais-Royal in Paris. In 1973 he directed the first production of La Cage aux folles starring Jean Poiret and Michel Serrault.

Television

Theater

Filmography

References

External links

1925 births
2012 deaths
French male film actors
French male television actors
French male stage actors
French film directors
French television directors
French theatre directors
People from Neuilly-sur-Seine
Deaths from lymphoma
Deaths from cancer in France
20th-century French male actors